The Subaru FB engine is the third and current generation of gasoline boxer-4 engine used in Subaru automobiles, and was announced on 23 September 2010. It follows the previous generation EJ-series engine which was introduced in 1989 and the first generation EA-series which was introduced in 1966. By increasing piston stroke and decreasing piston bore, Subaru aimed to reduce emissions and improve fuel economy, while increasing and broadening torque output compared to the EJ-series.

The Subaru FA engine series was derived later from the FB, but the two engine families share only a few common parts. In 2020, Subaru introduced the CB18 engine with improved efficiency to succeed the FB in several applications.

Overview
Unofficially, Subaru stated that "FB" stands for "FHI/Future and Brand New/Boxer". It was announced in September 2010 as the third generation (following the EA 1st and EJ 2nd generations) boxer engine family with 2.0 litre and 2.5 litre naturally aspirated variants. The FB has an all new block and head featuring dual overhead cams with intake and exhaust variable valve timing (which Subaru designates as AVCS, standing for Active Valve Control System), and a timing chain that replaced the timing belt. It results in less unburned fuel during cold start, thereby reducing emissions. Subaru is able to maintain the exterior dimension substantially unchanged by using asymmetrical connecting rods like those in the EZ36 engine. The FB is only marginally heavier than an equivalent-displacement EJ. In Jan 2011, Car and Driver was told direct injection would be added soon.

Subaru claims a 28-percent reduction in friction losses, mainly due to lighter pistons and connecting rods. A compact oil pump is also credited with contributing to the reduction in friction losses. The FB has a 10% improvement in fuel economy with the power coming on sooner and the torque band being broader.

The compression ratio is slightly higher, and the stroke has increased compared to the EJ engine; previously, the chassis precluded a longer stroke. These changes improve combustion efficiency and allow higher torque at lower speeds. The FB is built at Gunma Oizumi Plant and was initially available as a 2.5 litre displacement engine, starting in Forester models, with a 2.0 litre model to follow in Imprezas. 0W–20 oil is used to help fuel economy, and approximately 1 litre more oil is used as the newly adopted timing chain requires an oil supply.

FB16
All FB16 variants:
Displacement:  DOHC
Bore x stroke:

FB16

Compression: 11.0:1
2012+ EUDM Subaru Impreza XV 1.6i
Power:  at 5,600 rpm
Torque:  at 4,000 rpm
2017+ EUDM Subaru Impreza and 2018+ Subaru XV
Power:  at 6,200 rpm
Torque:  at 3,600 rpm
2017+ JDM Subaru Impreza and 2018+ Subaru XV
Power:  at 6,200 rpm
Torque:  at 3,600 rpm

FB16 DIT

The FB16 direct injection turbocharged (DIT) engine is the first FB-series engine with a turbocharger, and includes direct injection with an auto stop/start system. It is the base engine in the first-generation (2014–20 model years) Subaru Levorg. The Levorg also has an option for a 2.0 litre direct injection turbo engine, the FA20F. The design target for the FB16 DIT engine was to equal or exceed the performance of the FB25 naturally-aspirated engine fitted to the Legacy, using regular gasoline, according to the designer, Rei Sasaki. Although it shares its displacement with the naturally aspirated FB16, the only part the two engines share is the crankshaft.

Compression: 11.0:1
Application: 2014–20 Subaru Levorg
Power:  at 4,800-5,600 RPM
Torque:  at 1,800-4,800 RPM

FB20
The prior EJ20 used an oversquare  bore and stroke for a  swept displacement; in comparison, the FB20 features an undersquare bore and stroke for a slightly larger displacement.

All FB20 variants:
Displacement:  DOHC
Bore x stroke:

FB20B

Compression: 10.5:1
2011+ JDM Subaru Forester:
Power:  at 6,000 rpm
Torque:  at 4,200 rpm
2012-2016 USDM Subaru Impreza and 2012-2017 Subaru XV:
Power:  at 6,200 rpm
Torque:  at 4,200 rpm

FB20X

The existing FB20B was modified by reducing internal friction for the hybrid drivetrain, which incorporates an electric motor in the Lineartronic CVT. The high-voltage traction battery is installed below the cargo area for better weight balance. Combined system power is stated to be . Output of the gasoline engine is comparable to that of the non-hybrid FB20B.

Compression: 10.8:1
Application: 2014–16 Subaru XV Hybrid
Combined system output:
Power:  at 6,000 rpm
Torque:  at 2,000 rpm
Gasoline engine output:
Power: 
Torque: 
Electric motor output:
Power: 
Torque:

FB20D
Used in the fifth generation Impreza sedan and hatchback; compared to the FB20B, the FB20D adds direct injection, providing a slight increase in power and efficiency.
Compression: 12.5:1
2017+ Subaru Impreza (All trims) and 2018+ Subaru XV/Crosstrek (Base & Premium trims only)
Power (JDM, USDM) :  at 6,000 RPM
Power (EUDM, AUDM, THDM):  at 6,000 RPM
Torque:  at 4,000 RPM

FB20V
The 2019 Crosstrek is available with a plug-in hybrid system sourced from Toyota. The new hybrid drivetrain uses two motor-generator units; the traction motor (MG2) and battery are significantly larger compared to the previous XV Crosstrek Hybrid, and the vehicle is capable of moving under electric power alone for a limited distance. MG2 is used under parallel hybrid operation as well. MG1 is used as the starter motor and charges the battery for series hybrid operation. The direct-injection FB20V in the revised hybrid is detuned compared to the conventional FB20D.

Application: 2019+ Subaru Crosstrek Hybrid (PHEV)
Combined system output:
Power: 

Gasoline engine output:
Power:  at 5,600 RPM
Torque:  at 4,400 RPM
Electric traction motor (MG2) output:
Power: 
Torque:

FB20D e-Boxer
The direct-injection FB20D was also used in a mild parallel hybrid configuration similar to the FB20X. The mild hybrid drivetrain was fitted to selected trims for models sold in Japan (Forester, July 2018 and XV, October 2018), Europe (same models, starting in 2019), and Australia (same models, starting in 2020).

Application: 2019+ JDM and EUDM Subaru XV and Forester, selected models
Combined system output:
Power:  at 6,000 rpm
Torque:  at 4,000 rpm
Gasoline engine output:
Power: 
Torque: 
Electric motor output:
Power: 
Torque:

FB25

All FB25 variants:
Displacement:  DOHC
Bore x stroke:

FB25B

Compression: 10.0:1
Power:  at 5,800 rpm
Torque:  at 4,100 rpm
Application:
2011–18 North American Subaru Forester
2013–19 North American Subaru Legacy
2013–19 North American Subaru Outback

FB25D
The 2019 model year Subaru Forester was introduced at the 2018 New York International Auto Show with a revised version of the FB25 engine featuring direct injection, resulting in a slight boost in power and fuel economy. The seventh-generation 2020 model year Legacy and Outback also adopted the revised direct-injection FB25 as its base engine.

Compression: 12.0:1
Power:  at 5,800 rpm
Torque:  at 4,400 rpm
Application:
2019+ North American Subaru Forester
2020+ North American Subaru Legacy
2020+ North American Subaru Outback
2021+ North American Subaru Crosstrek (Sport & Limited trims, Outdoor trim level in Canada)
2024+ North American Subaru Impreza (RS trim)

References

External links

()
 
 
 

Subaru engines
Boxer engines
Gasoline engines by model
Four-cylinder engines